Arthraxon, commonly known as carpetgrass, is a genus of Asian, African and Australian plants in the grass family, Poaceae, containing the following species:

 Arthraxon antsirabensis – Madagascar
 Arthraxon castratus – Hainan, Indian Subcontinent, Indochina, Java
 Arthraxon cuspidatus – Ethiopia, Oman
 Arthraxon depressus – India
 Arthraxon echinatus – India, Nepal, Yunnan
 Arthraxon epectinatus – China, Himalayas
 Arthraxon hispidus – Asia, Africa, Australia, Indian Ocean islands
 Arthraxon inermis – India
 Arthraxon jubatus – Kerala
 Arthraxon junnarensis – Yunnan, India, Oman
 Arthraxon lanceolatus – eastern Africa, southern Asia
 Arthraxon lancifolius – Africa, southern Asia
 Arthraxon meeboldii – India
 Arthraxon microphyllus – Himalayas, Yunnan, Thailand
 Arthraxon multinervis – Guizhou
 Arthraxon nudus – southern Asia
 Arthraxon prionodes – eastern Africa, southern Asia
 Arthraxon raizadae – India
 Arthraxon santapaui – India, Himalayas
 Arthraxon submuticus – Himalayas, Yunnan
 Arthraxon typicus – Yunnan, Guangdong, Himalayas, Indochina, Java
 Arthraxon villosus – India

Several species now in the genera Dimeria and Microstegium were formerly included in Arthraxon:
 Arthraxon batangensis – Microstegium batangense
 Arthraxon hohenackeri – Dimeria hohenackeri
 Arthraxon lanceolatus and Arthraxon nodosus – Microstegium vimineum

See also
 List of Poaceae genera

References

Andropogoneae
Poaceae genera
Grasses of Africa
Grasses of Asia
Taxa named by Palisot de Beauvois